EyePhone may refer to:

 The EyePhone, a virtual reality headset that was released in 1987 by American company VPL Research
 The eyePhone, a fictional augmented reality-enabled smart glasses product depicted in the episode "Attack of the Killer App" of the American animated sitcom Futurama

See also
 iPhone